Hasanabad-e Olya (also Romanized as Ḩasanābād-e ‘Olyā) is a village in Dinavar Rural District, Dinavar District, Sahneh County, Kermanshah Province, Iran. At the 2006 census, its population was 137, in 36 families.

References 

Populated places in Sahneh County